Dr. Thomas Horton is a fictional character and patriarch of the Horton family on the NBC soap opera Days of Our Lives. He was played by Macdonald Carey from 1965 until his death in 1994.

Storylines
Tom Horton was born in 1910, married his wife Alice Grayson on March 7, 1930. Tom was a prominent doctor at Salem University Hospital and fathered five children, Tommy, Addie, Mickey, Bill, and Marie. In 1968 Tom would learn that his son Mickey was sterile, and when he confronted Laura Horton (Mickey's current wife) about her pregnancy she told Tom that Bill had raped her. The two agreed to keep their secrets from Mickey to spare his feelings. In 1977, Tom had a heart attack and remained in the hospital for several months. In 1978, Tom was promoted to Chief of Staff at University Hospital. Tom Horton read poetry, which he wrote himself, under the name Norm De Plume. He also wore a disguise so Alice wouldn't know what he was up to. When it was discovered their first marriage was invalid they married again on October 17, 1989. In 1993, Alice and Tom founded the Horton Center, which ran out of their home. The Horton Center provided shelter and help to run-away teens or families in need. Tom last appeared onscreen on February 9, 1994 due to Carey's failing health. Following Carey's death in March 1994, the character of Tom died off screen on June 21, 1994.

References

Days of Our Lives characters
Fictional physicians
Television characters introduced in 1965
Male characters in television
Horton family